Anticollix sparsata, the dentated pug, is a moth of the family Geometridae. The species was first described by Georg Friedrich Treitschke in 1828. It is found across the Palearctic from Europe to Japan.

The wingspan is 20–26 mm. The ground color of the forewings is light brown or grey. Along the costal edge there are most often some square dark spots (usually four), but these can be blurred. In the middle of the wing there are usually two or three small triangular black spots, but no trace of any dark transverse band. The hindwing has a conspicuous toothed border. It is monochrome grey. Both pairs of wings have small black spots along the outer edges. The larva is slender, green on the back and pale green on the abdomen, with a narrow white lateral stripe. It has scattered, short, bright bristles.   See also Prout. 

Adults are on wing from May to September in two generations.

The larvae feed on the flowers and leaves of Lysimachia vulgaris.

References

External links 
 Dentated pug at UKMoths
 Fauna Europaea
 Lepidoptera of Belgium

Melanthiini
Moths of Asia
Moths of Europe
Moths described in 1828
Taxa named by Georg Friedrich Treitschke